The 2 Seventh Avenue Express is a rapid transit service in the A Division of the New York City Subway. Its route emblem, or "bullet", is colored  since it uses the IRT Broadway–Seventh Avenue Line through most of Manhattan.

The 2 operates at all times between 241st Street in Wakefield, Bronx, and Flatbush Avenue–Brooklyn College in Flatbush, Brooklyn; limited rush hour service in the reverse-peak direction originates and terminates at New Lots Avenue in East New York, Brooklyn instead of Flatbush Avenue. Daytime service makes express stops in Manhattan and all stops elsewhere; late night service makes all stops.

Historically, 2 trains have also run to Crown Heights–Utica Avenue or New Lots Avenue. They ran exclusively on the IRT New Lots Line until 1983, when the 2 was routed to Flatbush Avenue. This is still the case with some rush-hour trains, albeit just to New Lots Avenue.

Service history

Early history 
The first section of what became the current 2 entered service on November 26, 1904, from the temporary 180th Street–Bronx Park terminal via the West Farms El to 149th Street–3rd Avenue. On July 10, 1905, the connection between the IRT Lenox Avenue Line and IRT White Plains Road Line (which was previously served by the Third Avenue El) opened, allowing subway service from Manhattan to the Bronx.

On January 9, 1908, the Joralemon Street Tunnel opened, connecting the current IRT Lexington Avenue Line to Brooklyn. At this time, trains ran from East 180th Street to Borough Hall. On May 1, 1908, trains were extended to Nevins Street and Atlantic Avenue.

On March 3, 1917, the IRT White Plains Road Line was extended to 219th Street. On March 31, 1917, the IRT White Plains Road Line was extended to 238th Street–Nereid Avenue, and to Wakefield–241st Street on December 13, 1920. On August 1, 1918, the entire IRT Broadway–Seventh Avenue Line was completed. On April 15, 1919, the Clark Street Tunnel, connecting the line to Brooklyn, opened as well.

Beginning on December 19, 1919, trains ran to South Ferry with some rush hour trains to Atlantic Avenue. In 1923, during rush hours, 2 trains alternated between South Ferry and Utica Avenue. Beginning December 1, 1924, 2 trains that had ended at South Ferry were extended to New Lots Avenue.

On January 16, 1928, the New York State Transit Commission announced that it had reached an agreement with the IRT to increase service on its lines by 8,000,000 car miles a year–the greatest increase since 1922. As part of the changes, on January 30, all West Farms trains were extended from Atlantic Avenue to Flatbush Avenue during middays.

As of 1934, 2 trains ran from 180th Street-Bronx Park to Flatbush Avenue weekdays and Saturday during daytime and to South Ferry evenings and Sundays, express in Manhattan. Late-night service was from 241st St to South Ferry, making all stops.  There were occasional lay-up/put-ins from New Lots. Four weekday evening trains turned at Atlantic. On September 5, 1937, some evening rush hour trains started running to Flatbush Avenue.

As of July 1, 1938, weekday and Saturday evening service was extended to Flatbush Avenue from South Ferry.

Sunday service was extended to Flatbush Avenue on March 5, 1950.

Beginning on December 26, 1950, alternate weekday rush trains were extended to 241st Street in the peak direction, but PM rush service to 241st Street was discontinued on June 26, 1952. Beginning on August 4, 1952, the 180th Street—Bronx Park station was closed, with trains rerouted to East 180th Street.

Under the New York City Transit Authority 
Morning rush hour service to 241st Street was cut back to Gun Hill Road on October 2, 1953. On March 19, 1954, weekend service was rerouted to New Lots Avenue at all times except late nights. On May 4, 1957, a track connection to the IRT Dyre Avenue Line was completed and daytime 2 trains were rerouted to Dyre Avenue. Evening service remained a shuttle between Dyre Avenue and East 180th Street, and morning rush service from Gun Hill Road was discontinued.

On December 20, 1957, weekday trains were rerouted to New Lots Avenue at all times except late nights. On June 26, 1958, late night service began between Dyre Avenue and East 180th Street. Beginning on December 12, 1958, late night service was extended to Flatbush Avenue, and the 2 began running express at all times. Beginning February 6, 1959, trains ran between Wakefield–241st Street and Flatbush Avenue at all times except late nights, when they ran between East 180th Street and New Lots Avenue.

Beginning on April 8, 1960, daytime service was rerouted from Dyre Avenue to 241st Street, and service in Brooklyn was rerouted from New Lots Avenue to Flatbush Avenue. At the same time, late night service was rerouted from Flatbush Avenue to New Lots Avenue.

Beginning on April 18, 1965, evening service was extended from East 180th Street to 241st Street, and daytime service was rerouted from Flatbush Avenue to New Lots Avenue.

On July 10, 1983, the 2 and  trains swapped terminals in Brooklyn, with 2 trains terminating at Flatbush Avenue and 3 trains terminating at New Lots Avenue. These changes were made to reduce non-revenue subway car mileage, to provide a dedicated fleet for each service, and to provide an easily accessible inspection yard for each service. The change allowed the 2 to be dedicated to 239th Street Yard and allowed the 3 to be assigned to Livonia Yard. With the rerouting of 3 trains, train lengths along the New Lots Line were reduced from 10 cars to 9 cars, within acceptable crowding levels, and train lengths along the Nostrand Avenue Line were increased from 9 to 10 cars, reducing crowding.

In Spring 1995, rush hour 5 service to 241st Street was cut back to Nereid Avenue. 241st Street had insufficient capacity to terminate all 2 and 5 trains during rush hours, requiring some 2 and 5 trips to terminate at Nereid Avenue. To ease passenger confusion regarding which trips terminate where and to provide more reliable service, it was decided to have all 2 trips terminate at 241st Street and have all 5 trains terminate at Nereid Avenue. This recommendation was made in response to comments made as part of the Northeast Bronx Comprehensive Study.

Recent history 
From March 2 to October 12, 1998, the IRT Lenox Avenue Line was rehabilitated. On weekdays, 2 trains ran via the IRT Lexington Avenue Line between 149th Street–Grand Concourse and Nevins Street uptown from 5:00 a.m. to midnight and downtown from midnight to 5:00 a.m. On October 3, 1999, the 2 began running local in Manhattan during late night hours so local stations would receive service every ten minutes.

On December 9, 1999, New York City Transit released a proposal, revising 2 and 5 service in the Bronx to eliminate a merge north of the East 180th Street station, increasing capacity and reducing delays, to the Metropolitan Transportation Authority (MTA) Board. Dyre Avenue-bound 5 trains would start running local along the White Plains Road Line, while 2 trains would run express. Nereid Avenue-bound 5 trains would continue to run express in the Bronx. As part of the change, the frequency of service at White Plains Road Line local station would decrease from 12 trains per hour to 7 trains per hour. Market research showed that riders at these stations preferred Lexington Avenue Line service. In addition, riders on the line north of East 180th Street would gain express service. This change would have been revenue neutral.

Shortly after the proposal was more widely announced in April 2000, Assemblyman Jeffrey Klein collected 2,000 signatures for a petition opposing the change. The MTA delayed the change's planned implementation by a month after receiving the petition. Opponents of the change also argued that it would have increased subway crowding on the 2 train, especially at the 72nd Street station on the IRT Broadway–Seventh Avenue Line. The change was also opposed by State Senator Eric Schneiderman, Assemblyman Scott Stringer and Public Advocate Mark Green. New York City Transit expected the passenger volume of downtown 2 trains in the morning rush hour to increase from 92% of capacity to 108% at 72nd Street. After Assembly Speaker Sheldon Silver put pressure on the MTA, the change was pushed back for an additional three months in May 2000. On September 24, 2000, a spokesperson for New York City Transit said that MTA Chairman E. Virgil Conway told planners to drop the change until service on the 5 was increased with the arrival of new R142 subway cars by early 2002.

After September 11, 2001, 2 trains ran local in Manhattan at all times so they would not be delayed behind  trains terminating at 14th Street. Daytime express service resumed on September 15, 2002.

Due to repairs to Hurricane Sandy-related damage on the Clark Street Tube, on weekends between June 17, 2017 and June 24, 2018, the 2 ran between Eastchester–Dyre Avenue in the Bronx and South Ferry in Lower Manhattan, with 5 trains replacing it in Brooklyn and the Bronx north of East 180th Street. Trains ran express only between 96th Street and Times Square–42nd Street during the daytime.

Route

Service pattern 
The following table shows the lines used by the 2, with shaded boxes indicating the route at the specified times:

Stations 

For a more detailed station listing, see the articles on the lines listed above.

Notes

References

External links 

 MTA NYC Transit – 2 Seventh Avenue Express
 
 

New York City Subway services